Nick Eggenhofer (December 5, 1897 - March 7, 1985) was a German-born American painter, illustrator and sculptor of the American West. He was the author of two books.

Early life
Eggenhofer was born in Gauting, Bavaria on December 5, 1897. He emigrated to the United States in 1913. He graduated from the Cooper Union in New York City.

Career
Eggenhofer was an illustrator of pulp magazines like Western Story Magazine from 1920 to 1950. He also illustrated over 50 Western-themed books. He became known as "the dean of Western illustrators."

Eggenhofer became a painter in the late 1950s, and he moved his studio to Cody, Wyoming in 1961. He painted and sculpted the American West, including horses, mules, cowboys and Native Americans. He exhibited his work at the Buffalo Bill Center of the West in Cody, Wyoming in 1975 and 1981, and at the Museum of Western Art in Kerrville, Texas in January 1985. He was a member of the Cowboy Artists of America from 1970 to 1974, and he won the Trustees Gold Medal from the National Cowboy & Western Heritage Museum in Oklahoma City, Oklahoma in 1973.

Eggenhofer authored two books, including an autobiography.

Personal life and death
Eggenhofer married Louise Strube in 1924. They had a daughter, Evelyn. Eggenhofer was a Freemason.

Eggenhofer died on March 7, 1985, in Cody, Wyoming, at age 87.

Selected works

Further reading

References

1897 births
1985 deaths
German emigrants to the United States
People from Starnberg (district)
People from Cody, Wyoming
Cooper Union alumni
American magazine illustrators
American male painters
20th-century American painters
American male sculptors
20th-century American sculptors
Artists from Wyoming
Artists of the American West